

Anton Glasl (13 February 1897 – 17 April 1965) was a general in the Wehrmacht of Nazi Germany during World War II. He was a recipient of the Knight's Cross of the Iron Cross.

Glasl was born in Freising in Bavaria. He served in World War I and World War II reaching the rank of Generalmajor.

Awards and decorations

 Knight's Cross of the Iron Cross on 11 October 1943 as Oberst and commander of Gebirgsjäger-Regiment 100

References

Bibliography

 

1897 births
1965 deaths
Major generals of the German Army (Wehrmacht)
Recipients of the Knight's Cross of the Iron Cross
Military personnel from Bavaria
People from Freising
German Army personnel of World War I
Gebirgsjäger of World War II